Hilpert is a German surname. Notable people with the surname include:

Carl Hilpert (1888–1947), German Wehrmacht general
Fritz Hilpert (born 1956), German musician
Heinz Hilpert (1890–1967), German actor, screenwriter and film director
Helmut Hilpert (1937–1997), German footballer
Marcus Hilpert (born 1971), German tennis player
Werner Hilpert (1897–1957), German politician

Fictional Character
 Stephan Hilpert, a fictional character in the anime Gundam SEED DESTINY

German-language surnames